The 37th Blue Dragon Film Awards ceremony was held on November 25, 2016 at Kyung Hee University's Peace Palace Hall in Seoul. It was live broadcast on SBS and hosted by Kim Hye-soo and Yoo Jun-sang.

Nominations and winners 
Complete list of nominees and winners

(Winners denoted in bold)

References 

2016 film awards
Blue Dragon Film Awards
2016 in South Korean cinema